Zed Lake Provincial Park is a provincial park in Manitoba, Canada, established in 1961. The park has 25 cottage lots, a campground, a boat launch and a beach.

Zed Lake is part of the Churchill River watershed, lying between Vandekerckhove Lake and Goldsand Lake. Jack pine and black spruce grow in open stands with a ground cover of lichens. The park is within the Churchill River Upland ecoregion of the Boreal Shield ecozone. Zed Lake greywacke is found to the east and the south of the lake. Its presence is an indication of an ancient ocean that existed approximately 1.88 billion years ago.

See also
List of protected areas of Manitoba
List of provincial parks in Manitoba

References

External links

Provincial parks of Manitoba
Protected areas of Manitoba